The Bromport Steamship Company was a British shipping line in the early 20th century. It was established in 1916 by the Lever Brothers by purchasing the ships of the Watson Shipping Company to handle the company's shipping business with West Africa. It was wound up in 1923 at a loss as its ships were not competitive in the post-First World War market.

Bibliography

Ships of the Bromport Steamship Company
Defunct shipping companies of the United Kingdom
Defunct companies based in Liverpool
Transport companies established in 1916
1916 establishments in England
British companies established in 1916